is a Japanese light novel series written by Natsume Akatsuki. The series follows Kazuma Sato, a boy who is sent to a fantasy world with MMORPG elements following his death, where he forms a dysfunctional adventuring party with a goddess, an archwizard, and a crusader. Originally serialized as a web novel on Shōsetsuka ni Narō between December 2012 and October 2013, KonoSuba was published as a printed light novel series by Kadokawa Shoten under the company's Kadokawa Sneaker Bunko imprint from October 2013 to May 2020. The light novel series features a divergent plot and illustrations by Kurone Mishima.

A manga adaptation, illustrated by Masahito Watari and Joseph Yokobori, began serialization in Fujimi Shobo's Monthly Dragon Age magazine from October 2014. A radio drama CD was released by HobiRecords in March 2015, and an anime television series adaptation produced by Studio Deen aired in Japan between January and March 2016. A second season of the anime aired between January and March 2017. A spin-off light novel series, KonoSuba: An Explosion on This Wonderful World!, began publication from July 2014. Both the light novels and the manga are licensed in North America by Yen Press. An anime film adaptation produced by J.C.Staff, titled KonoSuba: God's Blessing on This Wonderful World! Legend of Crimson, premiered on August 30, 2019. Drive intends premiering a third anime television series on April 2023, through its adaptation of KonoSuba: An Explosion on This Wonderful World!.

The first mobile game released series is a Mobile RPG game called Konosuba: Fantastic Days for Android and IOS on August 19, 2021. The game was developed by the South Korean video game company Nexon.

Premise 

Following an untimely and embarrassing death, Kazuma Sato, a Japanese teenage shut-in NEET, meets a goddess named Aqua, who offers to reincarnate him in a parallel world with MMORPG elements, where he can go on adventures and battle monsters. Despite being offered a superpowered item or ability to use in this new world, Kazuma, following some provocation, chooses Aqua herself to accompany him to the town of Axel, quickly finding her absent-mindedness to be less than beneficial. With Aqua unable to return to the afterlife until the Devil King is defeated, the two form a party and recruit two other members; an explosion-obsessed magician named Megumin and a masochistic crusader named Darkness. Due to the party's dysfunctional abilities, Kazuma quickly gives up on the idea of defeating the Devil King and tries to live a comfortable lifestyle, only to find the circumstances of his daily life are forcing him and his party to encounter and battle the Devil King's generals.

Publication

Web novel 
The original web novel series written by Natsume Akatsuki was published on Syosetu between December 2012 and October 2013. The author also wrote a side story featuring Wiz and Vanir. Akatsuki, who enjoyed playing fantasy video games like Wizardry and Final Fantasy, also derived much of KonoSuba fantasy elements from tabletop role-playing games.

Light novels 

A light novel version with illustrations by Kurone Mishima was released under Kadokawa Shoten's Kadokawa Sneaker Bunko imprint from October 1, 2013 to May 1, 2020. The light novel diverges significantly from the web novel's plot from the sixth volume onwards, and also features changes to the characters' ages. The final book in the series, Volume 17, contains information in its Afterword on possible future development that the teased "After Story" spin-offs might contain.

A Megumin-focused spin-off light novel series, also written and illustrated by Akatsuki and Mishima respectively, titled  and takes place a year prior to the main series, was released from July 1, 2014, to June 1, 2015 in three volumes. A two-volume sequel,  was released on December 28, 2016, and March 1, 2019. Another spin-off featuring Vanir was published on April 1, 2016, called  A third spin-off series titled  began publication on August 1, 2017. It is written by Hirukuma and illustrated by Uihime Hagure, and features Dust as the central character.

Yen Press announced on May 20, 2016, that it had licensed the light novels for release in North America. The first volume was released in conjunction with the second manga volume on February 21, 2017.

Media

Manga 

A manga adaptation of KonoSuba illustrated by Masahito Watari began serialization in the October 2014 issue of Fujimi Shobo's Monthly Dragon Age magazine on September 9, 2014. As of November 8, 2022, sixteen tankōbon volumes have been released.

A manga adaptation of the KonoSuba Fantastic Days smartphone game by Kasumi Morino began serialization in Media Factory's Monthly Comic Alive magazine on March 26, 2022.

Yen Press announced its acquisition of the manga adaptation at the same time that it licensed the original light novels.

Anime series 

An anime television series adaptation produced by Studio Deen aired on Tokyo MX between January 14, 2016, and March 16, 2016; later broadcasting on eight other networks and several video on demand streaming networks. The series was simulcast by Crunchyroll in several regions such as North America, and by AnimeLab in Australia. The series was directed by Takaomi Kanasaki and written by Makoto Uezu with character designs by Koichi Kikuta. An original video animation (OVA) was bundled with the ninth light novel of KonoSuba in June 2016. The anime's opening theme is "Fantastic Dreamer" by Machico while the ending theme is  performed by Sora Amamiya, Rie Takahashi, and Ai Kayano. On January 7, 2019, Crunchyroll announced that the series would receive an English dub. The first season's dub made its debut on January 25, 2019, with the second season's dub being released on February 25, 2020. Discotek Media released the first season on Blu-ray in North America on May 25, 2020.

The series was animated by Koichi Kikuta and Momoka Komatsu, with the former working on odd-numbered episodes and the latter on even-numbered. While Komatsu's character designs closely resembled those of the light novels and had more attractive appearances, Kikuta based his designs on children's shows like Pokémon as he felt KonoSuba story was similar to those found in such shows.

A second season aired between January 12, 2017, and March 16, 2017. Crunchyroll later added the second season. A second OVA was bundled with the twelfth volume of KonoSuba in July 2017. Discotek Media will release the second season on Blu-ray in North America in 2021. On July 25, 2017, Jun Fukushima and Takahashi, the voice actors of Kazuma and Megumin respectively, announced plans for a new KonoSuba anime project, later revealed to be a new movie, KonoSuba: God's Blessing on This Wonderful World! Legend of Crimson. On July 18, 2021, the official Twitter account for the KonoSuba anime confirmed that a new anime project was in production. The project was later revealed to be both a third season of the main series and an anime television series adaptation of KonoSuba: An Explosion on This Wonderful World!. Both series will be produced by Drive and directed by Yujiro Abe, with chief direction by Takaomi Kanasaki. The rest of the main staff are returning from previous seasons. KonoSuba: An Explosion on This Wonderful World! is set to premiere on April 6, 2023, on Tokyo MX and other networks. The opening theme is "Stay Free" by Machico, while the ending theme is "Jump In" by Takahashi and Aki Toyosaki. Crunchyroll also licensed the series.

On October 6, 2018, it was announced that characters from KonoSuba would appear in Isekai Quartet, a crossover anime also featuring characters from Re:Zero − Starting Life in Another World, Overlord, and The Saga of Tanya the Evil.

Theatrical film 

On June 25, 2018, a film adaptation was announced to be in development at J.C.Staff. The cast and staff reprised their roles from the TV series. The film is titled  and it premiered in Japan on August 30, 2019. Crunchyroll began streaming the English subtitled and English dub version on March 25, 2020, and on January 1, 2021, respectively.

Video games 
A PC video game developed by game creator Tachi, titled  is bundled with the first Blu-ray Disc/DVD volume of the anime series on March 25, 2016. The game is developed using the software RPG Maker VX Ace. Another video game, created by Team Ladybug and Krobon, titled  is bundled with the limited edition of first Blu-ray Disc/DVD volume of the anime series' second season and was released on April 28, 2017. The game is a side-scroller with gameplay resembling the Mega Man series.

A visual novel adaptation for PlayStation Vita and PlayStation 4,  was developed and published by 5pb., and was released in Japan on September 7, 2017. The game features an original story, in which Kazuma discovers a cursed ring that allows him to steal the underwear of others near him. He learns the only way to undo the curse would be by raising enough money. Judgment on this Greedy Game! introduces an "Underwear Judgment" system, where the player assists Kazuma in returning lost underwear to its rightful owner. Like the anime, Machico performed the opening "Million Smile", while Amamiya, Takahashi, and Kayano sang the game's ending theme "101 Pikime no Hitsuji". A Nintendo Switch port of the game was released on the Nintendo eShop on December 17, 2020.

A dungeon crawler game for the PS4 and Vita, titled  was released in Japan on June 27, 2019. An updated version of the game,  was released in Japan on August 27, 2020, for the PS4 and Nintendo Switch. A mobile gacha game titled  was released for iOS and Android devices on February 27, 2020. An outfit crafting game,  was released on September 24, 2020, for the PS4 and Switch. A dungeon RPG, was released for PS4 and Switch in 2022.

Audio CDs 
A radio drama CD, featuring a different voice cast to the anime, was released by HobiRecords on March 1, 2015. A second drama CD, along with an original soundtrack by Kouda Masato and a character song album, was released in March 2017.

Reception

Popularity 
The KonoSuba light novels have been quite popular. As of March 2, 2016, the 11-volume series has a total of 1.5 million copies in print, each volume selling 136,000 copies. In January 2018, the light novel series ranked first among the top 50 best selling digital manga and light novels in worldwide stores by BookWalker. As of February 2019, the light novels had 6.5 million copies in print. In a review of the first novel, Andy Hanley praised the series' comedy reflected in the "tired genre" as well as its cast finding them appealing based on their traits. However, Hanley criticized the short length of the first volume. The series won BookWalker's 2016 Grand Prix Award.

In 2016, the anime was voted the tenth-best TV anime in the Newtype 2015–16 Awards. KonoSuba also finished runner-up for Best Comedy in the Anime Awards 2016 to Haven't You Heard? I'm Sakamoto. In 2019, the anime was chosen as the favorite isekai series in the Funimation 'Decade of Anime' fan polls, where they vote for the favorite anime series through decade in various genres.

Critical response 

Like its light novel counterpart, the anime has received positive reception for its comedy, parody of the isekai genre, and faithful adaptation of the light novels. Reviewing the first few episodes, Anime News Network (ANN)'s Theron Martin described the second episode as "the funniest episode of anime I have seen since Monthly Girls' Nozaki-kun aired", while also praising the series' musical score. The voice acting has also been a subject of praise; Nick Creamer of ANN commended Sora Amamiya and Rie Takahashi's roles as Aqua and Megumin for the energy provided in their performances, while Martin applauded Jun Fukushima for his work in voicing Kazuma, considering his dry tone an additional factor in the show's humor.

From the Legend of Crimson'''s release in Japan, Daryl Harding, writing for Crunchyroll News praised the story and comedy of the film noting that the "classic humor of (the TV series) translates well to a film runtime." Daryl Harding did criticise the film by stating that "It doesn’t look too different than the TV series" even with "more effects placed over the animation during scenes of explosive magic."

In contrast, a common criticism of the anime was its inconsistent character animation, one that was described as "low budget" as characters appeared off-model. Koichi Kikuta responded by stating such design was intentional, hoping to "bring out the individuality of each character" rather than the prettier artwork in the light novels; to do this, Kikuta's animation displayed "their more human sides, like their unflattering traits and their distressed moments." Crunchyroll's Kim Morrissy considered the animation to be humorous, especially fitting in a comedic anime. Kotaku writer Richard Eisenbeis explained much of the series' humor derives from the deconstruction of Kazuma's hopes of becoming the hero of a fantasy world, instead realizing he is forced to struggle his way through the world. Comparing Kazuma's problems in a fantasy world to those in real life, Creamer wrote about a sense of relatability between the series' protagonists and the audience, as the party deals with issues like debt and taking questionable jobs because of high pay. On a critical note, Creamer disapproved of Kazuma's negative attitude, which he felt harmed the comedy in the series.KonoSuba characters, especially those in Kazuma's party, have garnered favorable reactions in the anime community. Creamer described the group as possessing a "strange but endearing chemistry," as the members are unfriendly with one another, yet are close. Morrissy added the party's "emotional bond is also evident in the ways they interact with each other. My favorite thing about the anime is that it takes the time to draw these nuances out onscreen and express them with visual flair." Megumin in particular has been considered one of the series' most popular characters, winning Sneaker Bunko's official Favorite KonoSuba Character poll. She was also the sixth-highest vote in Newtype 2015–16 Awards for Best Female Character (Kazuma was third in the male category) and received the most "Other" votes in the Best Girl category in Crunchyroll's Anime Awards 2016. In an interview with internet personality The Anime Man, Natsume Akatsuki described Megumin as giving off "a pure and elegant atmosphere" like one of an anime heroine or waifu, hence her popularity among fans.

 Ban in Russia 
In May 2021, KonoSuba was one of five isekai-oriented anime titles (along with Zombie Land Saga, That Time I Got Reincarnated as a Slime, Princess Lover!, and Nekopara'') that were given a limited ban by the Russian government for their depiction of reincarnation, which was alleged to encourage suicide by lawmakers.

Notes 

LN notes

 represents the light novel series in X.Y format, where X represents the volume number and Y represents the chapter number.

Original titles

References

External links 

  
  
  
 

 
2013 Japanese novels
2014 Japanese novels
2016 anime OVAs
2016 Japanese novels
2017 video games
2023 anime television series debuts
2023 anime OVAs
Anime and manga based on light novels
Book series introduced in 2012
Comedy anime and manga
Crunchyroll anime
Discotek Media
Fiction about reincarnation
Fiction about the afterlife
Fujimi Shobo manga
Isekai anime and manga
Isekai novels and light novels
Kadokawa Dwango franchises
Kadokawa Sneaker Bunko
Light novels first published online
Light novels
Massively multiplayer online role-playing games in fiction
Mass media franchises
Media Factory manga
Medialink
Monarchy in fiction
Novels about the afterlife
Shōnen manga
Shōsetsuka ni Narō
Studio Deen
Sword and sorcery anime and manga
Television shows based on light novels
Television shows written by Makoto Uezu
Tokyo MX original programming
Upcoming anime television series
Visual novels
Works banned in Russia
Yen Press titles